Served Live is the first live album by American country band Asleep at the Wheel. Recorded over two nights at the Austin Opry House in Austin, Texas in January 1979, it was produced by the band's frontman Ray Benson with Chuck Flood, and released on June 11, 1979 as the group's final album on Capitol Nashville. Neither the album nor its sole single, "Choo Choo Ch'Boogie", registered on the US Billboard record charts – the band's first album since 1974 not to do so.

Following the release of Collision Course in 1978, several members left Asleep at the Wheel. Served Live is thus the band's first album not to feature founding member LeRoy Preston and original pianist Floyd Domino. It was also the first since their debut not to feature bassist Tony Garnier, and also marked the departures of fiddler Bill Mabry and drummer Chris York. New members on the record were Johnny Nicholas, Spencer Starnes, Daniel J. Menudo and Fran Christina.

Background
Asleep at the Wheel's first live album was recorded on January 19 and 20, 1979 at the Austin Opry House in Austin, Texas. The recording was facilitated by Manchaca, Texas-based remote recording company Reelsound, with Chuck Flood producing and Hugh Davies engineering. The album was the band's first not to feature founding member LeRoy Preston and original pianist Floyd Domino, both of whom had left the previous year alongside bassist Tony Garnier, fiddler Bill Mabry and drummer Chris York. In the place of the departed members were guitarist Johnny Nicholas, bassist Spencer Starnes, pianist Daniel J. Menudo and drummer Fran Christina.

Served Live was released by Capitol Records on June 11, 1979. The album did not register on the official US Billboard charts, although it did reach number 10 on the Record World Country Albums chart, number 57 on the Cash Box Top Country Albums chart, and number 166 on the Cash Box Top Albums chart. The performance of "Choo Choo Ch'Boogie", originally recorded for the band's second album Asleep at the Wheel, was released as the album's only single in June 1979.

Reception

Contemporary reviews of Served Live were generally positive. Cash Box magazine described the record as "another solid package of big band material that could make even the staunchest non-dancer get up and do some toe-tapping and finger-snapping," and as "a live album full of energy and spice and lots of sassy horns". Similarly, a short review published in Record World magazine noted that "The group is well-known for its rousing live performances, and much of that energy is captured here, from the laid-back jazzy treatment ... to the good time honky-tonk mood" praising the collection as "a nice balance of sound quality and the live presence". People magazine claimed that "There's a gutsy, loose Friday-Saturday night feel to the album", praising the band for "demonstrat[ing] a gratifying recognition of their musical heritage".

Retrospective reviews for Served Live were less positive. Robert Christgau awarded the album a C+ rating, his lowest for any of the band's releases to date, writing that "Side one is playable, although "God Bless the Child" was born under a bad sign, and the hot live performances don't suit the living room as well as the more delicate studio versions available on three out of five songs. Side two, however, sounds terribly forced. Not only does John Nicholas's overstated, bloozey original make clear that LeRoy Preston's songwriting is going to be missed, but his duet with Chris O'Connell is too close to Peggy Scott and Jo-Jo Benson to remain so far away." On AllMusic, the album is rated two out of five stars, also the lowest of the band's releases up to that point, although no written review is included.

Track listing

Personnel

Asleep at the Wheel
Ray Benson – lead guitar, vocals, production
Chris O'Connell – rhythm guitar, vocals
Johnny Nicholas – guitar, piano, harmonica, vocals
Lucky Oceans – pedal steel guitar
Spencer Starnes – upright and electric basses
Daniel J. Menudo – piano, organ
Fran Christina – drums
Danny Levin – fiddle, electric mandolin
Pat "Taco" Ryan – saxophones, clarinet

Additional personnel
Johnny Gimble – fiddle
Andy Stein – fiddle, baritone saxophone
Link Davis Jr. – saxophones
Jimmie Vaughan – guitar 
Chris York – drums 
Chuck Flood – production
Hugh Davies – engineering
Greg Klinginsmith – engineering assistance
Malcolm Harper – remote recording
Roy Kohara – art direction
Julie Speed – sleeve illustration
Don Peterson – photography

References

External links

Asleep at the Wheel albums
1979 live albums
Capitol Records live albums